Radar Poshteh (also Romanized as Rādār Poshteh; also known as Rādār Poshteh-ye Bālā) is a village in Khara Rud Rural District, in the Central District of Siahkal County, Gilan Province, Iran. At the 2006 census, its population was 293, in 67 families.

References 

Populated places in Siahkal County